The NYCity News Service is a multi-media, Web-based wire service run by the CUNY Graduate School of Journalism in New York City. Stories and other content are reported, written and prepared by students, under the supervision of faculty members and a News Service Director. The service focuses on neighborhood stories and has fed content to local publications such as the New York Daily News and the Park Slope Courier.

CUNY announced the appointment of Jere Hester, the former City Editor of the Daily News, as News Service Director on November 13, 2006. Hester's move to academia was described as a "huge blow" to the Daily News in the pages of its rival newspaper, the New York Post. The first post was made to NYCity News Service's website on January 12, 2007 , although it had been feeding stories to the Daily News since December 11, 2006.

NYCity News Service does not charge for its content, which is made available to news organizations on a first-come, first-served basis. However, attribution credit is required to acknowledge the students' work.

Contact information
Jere Hester, News Service Director: jere.hester@journalism.cuny.edu

External links
NYCity News Service

CUNY Graduate School of Journalism